Choeromorpha sulphurea is a species of beetle in the family Cerambycidae. It was described by Francis Polkinghorne Pascoe in 1865, originally under the genus Agelasta. It is known from Sulawesi.

References

Choeromorpha
Beetles described in 1865